Nene Valley may refer to:

Places
Australia
Nene Valley (South Australia), a valley
Nene Valley, South Australia, a locality
Nene Valley Conservation Park, a protected area in South Australia
United Kingdom
A valley associated with the River Nene

Other
Nene Valley (1852), a ship wrecked in South Australia
Nene Valley Colour Coated Ware, Romano-British ceramic produced from the mid-2nd to 4th centuries AD
Nene Valley Railway, a heritage railway in the United Kingdom